Mohammed Amin (born November 15, 1913, date of death unknown) was an Egyptian boxer who competed in the 1936 Summer Olympics. In 1936 he was eliminated in the second round of the light heavyweight class after losing his fight to Robey Leibbrandt of South Africa.

1936 Olympic results
 Round of 32: defeated Carl Vinciquerra (United States) on points
 Round of 16: lost to Robey Leibbrandt (South Africa) on points

External links
Mohammed Amin's profile at Sports Reference.com

1913 births
Year of death missing
Light-heavyweight boxers
Olympic boxers of Egypt
Boxers at the 1936 Summer Olympics
Egyptian male boxers
20th-century Egyptian people